is a Japanese racing driver for Honda Racing Corporation, currently driving in the Autobacs Super GT Series with Team Kunimitsu, and the Japanese Super Formula Championship with Nakajima Racing. He is a three-time champion in Super Formula, and a two-time champion in the GT500 class of Super GT. Yamamoto is also the only driver to have won both the Super Formula and GT500 championships in the same season multiple times, a feat which he accomplished in 2018 and 2020.

Career

Early career
Yamamoto started karting in 1994, and won the All-Japan Kart Championship FA class title in 2002. In 2006, he graduated from the Suzuka Circuit Racing School Formula (SRS-F) with a scholarship to compete in Formula Challenge Japan (FCJ). In 2007, he joined the Honda Formula Dream Project (HFDP) academy, and finished second in the Formula Challenge Japan championship with two wins in his first season in single-seaters. He moved up to the Japanese Formula 3 Championship with Honda Team Real in 2008, finishing fifth in the championship class with one win. In 2009, he moved to the National Class with HFDP Racing (also managed by Real Racing), and won the class title with eight wins in sixteen races.

Super GT

Yamamoto debuted in the Super GT Series in 2010, driving a Honda HSV-010 GT for Team Kunimitsu alongside co-driver Takuya Izawa. He scored a podium on his debut at Suzuka, and took another third place at the Suzuka endurance round. During the following two seasons, he scored three more podium finishes. Yamamoto was fifth in the drivers' standings in 2012, the best result for a Honda driver that season. 

In 2013, Yamamoto transferred to the Weider Modulo Dome Racing team, and took his first Super GT victory at the Suzuka 1000km endurance race. He and co-driver Frédéric Makowiecki finished fourth in the championship, a career best for Yamamoto. In 2014 he won the summer race at Fuji to take the first win for the new Honda NSX Concept-GT car. Yamamoto, who shared the car with Makowiecki, Izawa, and Jean-Karl Vernay during the season, finished fourth in the drivers' championship for the second consecutive season.

Yamamoto returned to Team Kunimitsu in 2015, reuniting with Izawa. He won at Sugo that season, and finished a career-best third in the championship. Over the following two seasons, Yamamoto would score three more podium finishes, including a third place in the 2017 Suzuka 1000km. 

Ahead of the 2018 season, 2009 Formula One world champion Jenson Button joined Team Kunimitsu as Yamamoto's co-driver. In their first race together at Okayama, Yamamoto and Button finished second. They finished second again at Suzuka in May, then won at Sportsland Sugo and finished third at Motegi to clinch the GT500 Drivers' and Teams' Championships. It was the first JGTC/Super GT title for Team Kunimitsu, and having won Super Formula earlier that year, Yamamoto became the first driver to win both titles in the same year in fourteen years.

Yamamoto and Button finished the 2019 season in eighth with two podiums. After the season, Button left Super GT, and Yamamoto was joined by Tadasuke Makino for the 2020 season. Yamamoto scored seven top-six finishes in eight races in 2020, including three podium finishes. In the final round at Fuji, Yamamoto was running in second place on the final lap, until race leader Ryo Hirakawa of TGR Team KeePer TOM's ran out of fuel coming out of the final corner. Yamamoto was able to overtake Hirakawa to take the victory and clinch his and Team Kunimitsu's second set of GT500 titles in three years.

In 2021, after winning the third race of the year at Motegi with Makino, Yamamoto established a points lead as high as 16 points before the penultimate round. He was in position to win his third GT500 title in four years at the final race at Fuji, but was taken out from the race by GT300 class driver Ren Sato, meaning he ended the year third in the standings.

Super Formula
Yamamoto entered the Super Formula Championship (then known as Formula Nippon) in 2010, driving a Honda-powered car for Nakajima Racing. He scored seven top-seven finishes in the eight races of 2010, finishing seventh in the standings in his first year. He moved to Team Mugen in 2011 and took pole position at Suzuka in his first race with the team, but did not finish after being involved in a first lap incident. 

The 2013 season saw him score five podiums and a maiden series victory. He finished the 2013 tied with the same number of points as André Lotterer, who also had more wins on the season. However, the championship tiebreaker in Super Formula at the time went to the driver that scored the most points at the last race meeting of the season at Suzuka. Yamamoto's win and third place finish in the double-header finale at Suzuka were enough to win the championship ahead of Lotterer, who missed the finale due to his commitments in the FIA World Endurance Championship with Audi.

After the introduction of the new Dallara SF14 in 2014, Yamamoto took five pole positions, four podiums and two wins (both at Suzuka) from 2014 to 2017, and was the leading Honda driver in the standings in 2014 and 2015. He won his second championship in 2018, with three wins on the season including the first and last rounds at Suzuka, the latter of which clinched his second title ahead of Nick Cassidy. 

Yamamoto switched teams to Dandelion Racing for the 2019 season. He began the year with three podiums and a win in the first three races of the season, but went on to finish runner-up in the championship behind Cassidy. He won the championship for the third time in 2020, by just two points over Ryo Hirakawa (whom he had also defeated to win the GT500 title earlier that year). This made him the first driver to win both the GT500 and Super Formula championships in the same year on multiple occasions. It also made him only the fourth driver to win three or more Japanese Top Formula championships, joining six-time champion Kazuyoshi Hoshino, five-time champion Satoru Nakajima, and four-time champion Satoshi Motoyama.

With his third championship and second 'double championship' secured, Yamamoto moved back to Nakajima Racing for the 2021 season. For the first time since 2014, Yamamoto failed to win a race or record a podium finish, slumping to a career-worst 13th place in the championship.

Formula One 

After winning the GT500 and Super Formula titles in 2018, Yamamoto had accumulated the requisite 40 points required to attain an FIA Super License and compete in Formula One. Yamamoto would get his first chance to drive a Formula One car in competition, when he drove for Scuderia Toro Rosso-Honda in the first practice session of the 2019 Japanese Grand Prix. He completed the most laps in the session and set a fastest lap time just 0.1s off the pace of regular driver Daniil Kvyat. This participation made him the first Japanese driver to drive during a Formula One Grand Prix session since Kamui Kobayashi in 2014.

Despite the impressive performance, Yamamoto was not selected by Toro Rosso (who had changed their name to Scuderia AlphaTauri) or Red Bull Racing for an F1 race seat in 2020.

Racing record

Career summary

Complete Super GT results

‡ Half points awarded as less than 75% of race distance was completed.

Complete Super Formula results
(key) (Races in bold indicate pole position) (Races in italics indicate fastest lap)

‡ Half points awarded as less than 75% of race distance was completed.

Complete Formula One participations
(key)

References

External links

Official website
driverdb

1988 births
Living people
Japanese racing drivers
Japanese Formula 3 Championship drivers
Super GT drivers
Formula Nippon drivers
Super Formula drivers
Formula Challenge Japan drivers
Nakajima Racing drivers
Mugen Motorsports drivers
Dandelion Racing drivers
Team Kunimitsu drivers
Karting World Championship drivers